The Faculty of Medicine, Burapha University is the first medical school in Eastern Thailand, located in Mueang Chonburi District, Chonburi Province. It is part of the group of Health Science Faculties of Bangsaen Campus.

History 
Funding was allocated in 1994 in a proposal to expand the 'Burapha University Health Sciences Center' into a university hospital, along with setting up a new faculty for Medicine specifically. The faculty was set up on 2 September 2002 and the Doctor of Medicine degree was approved by the group of universities on 10 February 2003 and the first cohort of 32 medical students were admitted for the 2007 academic year, following approval from the Medical Council of Thailand. The first group of students consisted only of students completing high school education in 12 provinces: Samut Prakan, Nakhon Nayok, Chachoengsao, Chonburi, Rayong, Chanthaburi, Trat, Prachinburi, Lopburi, Saraburi and Phra Nakhon Si Ayutthaya, with the expectation to provide future medical personnel particularly in Eastern Thailand.

Departments 

 Department of Anaethesiology
 Department of Community Medicine and Family Medicine
 Department of Internal Medicine
 Department of Obstetrics and Gynaecology
 Department of Orthopaedic Surgery and Rehabilitative Medicine
 Department of Ophthalmology and Otolaryngology
 Department of Pathology and Forensic Medicine
 Department of Paediatrics
 Department of Psychiatry
 Department of Radiology and Nuclear Medicine
 Department of Surgery

Teaching Hospitals 

 Burapha University Hospital
 Chaophraya Abhaibhubejhr Hospital (CPIRD)
 Rayong Hospital (CPIRD)
Somdech Phra Pinklao Hospital, The Royal Thai Navy (CPIRD)
 Queen Sirikit Naval Hospital, The Royal Thai Navy (CPIRD)
 Queen Savang Vadhana Memorial Hospital, Thai Red Cross Society (CPIRD)

See also 

 List of medical schools in Thailand

References 

Article incorporates material from the corresponding article in the Thai Wikipedia.

Medical schools in Thailand
University departments in Thailand